This is a list of people who have been VJs on MTV, the music video channel in the U.S. and around the world.

Originally hired to represent a wide array of musical tastes and personal ethnicities, VJs eventually became famous in their own right. Initially, they were nothing more than on-air personalities, but as the popularity of MTV grew, they began to branch out past just introducing music clips. Soon, they were considered by many to be full-fledged music journalists, interviewing major music celebrities and hosting their own television shows on the channel.

MTV U.S.

MTV News 

A list of current and former MTV News on-site personalities. Current ones are marked with an asterisk.

 Serena Altschul
 Sway Calloway
 Jim Cantiello
 Chris Connelly
 Ana Marie Cox
 Christina Garibaldi
 Mark Goodman
 Carolyne Heldman
 Liz Hernandez (MTV Tr3s)
 Josh Horowitz*
 Tim Kash
 John Kearns
 Yoonj Kim*
 Kurt Loder
 Brian McFayden
 Brian "B. Dot" Miller*
 John Norris
 SuChin Pak
 Heather Parry
 Dometi Pongo*
 Iann Robinson
 Tabitha Soren
 Jamil Smith
 Alison Stewart
 Kim Stolz
 Gaby Wilson
 Gideon Yago
 Nick Zano

Current VJs

Former VJs

MTV 

Abby Gennet
Adam Curry
Adrienne Bailon
Alan Hunter
Alison Stewart
Ananda Lewis
Andrew Daddo
Ann Marie Curren
Ashlee Simpson
Aurelia Bilen
Bill Bellamy
Brian McFayden
Carmen Electra
Carolyne Heldman
Carson Daly
China Kantner
Chris Booker
Cipha Sounds
Colin Quinn
Daisy Fuentes
Damien Fahey
Dan Cortese
Dave Holmes
Dave Kendall
DJ Clue
DJ Skribble
Doctor Dré
Downtown Julie Brown
Dweezil Zappa
Ed Lover
Fab 5 Freddy
Funkmaster Flex
Hilarie Burton
Idalis DeLeon
J. J. Jackson
Jesse Camp
Jim Shearer
John Ales
John Norris
John Sencio
Julie Brown
K.K. Holiday
Karen Duffy
Kari Wührer
Karyn Bryant
Kennedy
Kevin Seal
La La Vasquez
Laura Lifshitz
Lenay Chantelle
Lewis Largent
Lyndsey Rodrigues
Mandy Lauderdale
Mandy Moore
Maria Sansone
Mark Goodman
Martha Quinn
Matt Pinfield
Michael Alvarez
Nadya Hutagalung
Nina Blackwood
Pauly Shore
Peter Zaremba
Quddus
Rachel Sweet
Raymond Munns
Riki Rachtman
Serena Altschul
Simon Rex
Stephen Colletti
Steve Isaacs
Susie Castillo
Teck Holmes
Thalia DaCosta
Tim Sommer
Toby Amies
Tyrese
Vanessa Minnillo

MTV2 
Chris Booker
DJ Envy
Jancee Dunn
Jim Shearer
Kris Kosach

MTVU 
Carly Henderson
Gardner Loulan
George Oliphant
Sophia Parola
Kim Stolz

MTV Chi 
Angel Tang

MTV Desi 
Niharika Desai
Tim Kash
Utkarsh Ambudkar

MHD 
George Oliphant
Jeremy Bloom

MTV K 
Grace Subervi

MTV UK & Ireland

Past VJs 

 Ray Cokes
 Simone Angel
 Paul King
 Marcel Vanthilt
 Enrico Silvestrin
 Chris Salewicz
 Downtown Julie Brown
 Jasmine Dotiwala
 Terry Christian
 Sonya Saul
 Rebecca de Ruvo
 Steve Blame
 Pip Dann
 Kristiane Backer
 Marijne van der Vlugt
 Davina McCall
 Lisa I'Anson
 Maria Guzenina
 Carolyn Lilipaly
 Miles Hunt
 Toby Amies
 Eden Harel
 Christian Ulmen
 Lars Oostveen
 Katja Schuurman
 Melanie Sykes
 Cat Deeley
 Trevor Nelson
 Trey Farley
 Kelly Brook
 Neil Cole
 Joanne Colan
 Becky Griffin
 Jason Danino-Holt
 Ulrika Eriksson
 Ina Geraldine
 Laura Whitmore
 Amelia Hoy
 Charlotte Thorstvedt
 Thomas Madvig
 Steve Blame

MTV Asia 
Includes the Philippines, Indonesia, Singapore, Malaysia, Thailand, India, Hong Kong, Taiwan and Vietnam.

Former VJs

Hanli Hoefer (Singapore) 
Richard Herrera (Singapore) 
Ruth Winona Tao (Hong Kong) later moved to Channel V
David Wu – (Hong Kong) later moved to Channel V
Angela Chow (Taiwan) – later moved to Channel V
Nadya Hutagalung (Indonesia)
Kamal Sidhu (India) - Originally from Channel V later moved to MTV Asia/MTV India 
Rahul Khanna (India)
Regine Maristela (Tolentino) (Philippines)
Donita Rose (Philippines)
Sally Yeh (Taiwan)
Utt Panichkul (Thailand)
Cyrus Broacha (India)
Sonia Couling (Thailand)
Jamie Aditya (Indonesia)
Mike Kasem (USA)
Alex Abbad (Indonesia)
Nur Fazura (Malaysia)
G. Toengi (Philippines)
Jeremiah Odra (Philippines)
Max Loong (Malaysia)
Francis Magalona (Philippines) 
K. C. Montero (Philippines)
Cindy Kurleto (Philippines)
Sarah Meier (Philippines)
Jeff Enos (Thailand)
Holly Graberak (Singapore)
Colby Miller (Philippines)
May Wan (Malaysia)
Choy Wan (Malaysia) 
Belinda Panelo (Philippines)
Sarah Sechan – (Indonesia)
Denise Keller (Singapore)
Sophiya Haque (UK)
Jamie Wilson (Philippines)
Mariel Rodriguez (Philippines)
Sharon Gomes Thomas - MTV News
Alan M. Wong (Singapore) - MTV
Rita Tsang (British Chinese)- MTV News
Daniel Mananta (Indonesia)
Belinda Lee Xin Yu (Singapore)
Danny McGill (USA) Original VJ of the first Incarnation of MTV Asia, moved to Channel V and moved back to MTV Asia/MTV India (Second Incarnation) 
Anu Kottoor (India)

MTV Australia

Former VJs
Kyle Sandilands
Lyndsey Rodrigues
Jason Dundas
Richard Wilkins
Ruby Rose
Erin McNaught
Keiynan Lonsdale

MTV India

Current VJs

Anusha Dandekar
 Ayesha Adlakha
 Benafsha Soonwalla
 Baseer Ali
 Gaelyn Mendonca
 Nikhil Chinapa
 Rannvijay Singh
 Varun Sood

Former VJs

Amrita Arora
 Ayushmann Khurrana
 Bani J
 Cyrus Broacha
 Cyrus Sahukar
 Deepti Gujral
José Covaco
Malaika Arora
Maria Goretti
Mia Uyeda
Mini Mathur
Nafisa Joseph
Raageshwari Loomba
 Rhea Chakraborty
 Shenaz Treasury
 Siddharth Bhardwaj
 Soniya Mehra
 Sophie Choudry
 Sunanda Wong

MTV Netherlands

Former VJs

Sander Lantinga
Fleur van de Kieft
Tooske Breugem
Katja Schuurman
Simone Angel
Sylvie Meis
Johnny de Mol
Erik de Zwart
Carolyn Lilipaly
Marijne van der Vlugt

MTV Pakistan

Current VJs
 Saira Yousuf
 Palwasha Yousuf
 Mawra Hocane
 Urwa Hocane

Former VJs
 Anoushey Ashraf
 Mahira Khan
 Faizan
 Ayesha Omar
 Ali Safina
 Dr Ali Munir

MTV Philippines

Former VJs

Victor Basa
Anne Curtis
Margaret Nales Wilson
Kat Alano
Sib Sibulo
Andi Manzano
Marc Abaya
Paolo Bediones
KC Concepcion
Maike Evers
Nicole Fonacier
Cindy Kurleto
Francis Magalona
Sarah Meier
Colby Miller
K. C. Montero
Belinda Panelo
Derek Ramsay
Mariel Rodriguez
Giselle Toengi
Yassi Pressman
Andre Paras
Shy Carlos
Sam Pinto
Josh Padilla
Kito Romualdez
Katarina Rodriguez
Allen Nicole Angats
Jess Connely
Jodie Tarasek
Markus Paterson

MTV Indonesia

Former VJs 

 Alblen Filindo Fabe
 Arie Untung
 Ben Kasyafani
 Boy William
 Cathy Sharon
 Daniel Mananta
 Dewi Rezer
 Eddi Brokoli
 Evan Sanders
 Feli Sumayku
 Fikri Ramadhan
 Jamie Aditya
 Marissa Nasution
 Mike Muliardo
 Millane Fernandez
 Nadya Hutagalung
 Nirina Zubir
 Rianti Cartwright
 Sarah Sechan
 Shanty
 Vina Yuanna

MTV Thailand

Former VJs
Michele Waagaard
Sonia Couling
Garanick (Nicky) Thongpiam
Poomjai (Poom) Thangsanga
Chompoonut (Alex) Sawaetwong
Janesuda (Jane) Parnto
Jay Ploadpai

MTV Korea

Current VJs
Seorak

MTV Taiwan

Past VJs
Linda Liao

MTV Brasil

Current VJs 
 Beatriz Coelho
 Spartakus Santiago

Past VJs 

 Fernanda Lima
 Marcos Mion
 Marina Person
 Monique Olsen
 Luisa Micheletti
 Carla Lamarca
 Adriane Galisteu
 Marcio Garcia
 Babi Xavier
 João Gordo
 André Vasco
 Mariana Weickert
 Madame Mim
 Ferrugem
 Marcelo Tas
 Kid Vinil
 Maria Fernanda Cândido
 Hermes & Renato (comedy troupe)
 Adriana Lessa
 Fernando Meligeni
 Gisele Bündchen
 Jimmy London
 Luana Piovani
 Rita Lee
 Fernanda Tavares
 Rodrigo Leão
 Kika Martinez
 Sophia Reis
 Leo Madeira
 Penélope Nova
 Ronaldo Lemos
 Nasi
 Emicida
 Arnaldo Antunes
 Ellen Jabour
 Bento Ribeiro
 Bruno Sutter
 Cazé Peçanha
 Dani Calabresa
 Daniela Cicarelli
 Marcelo Adnet
 Tatá Werneck
 MariMoon
 Titi Müller
 Chuck Hipolitho
 Didi Effe
 Juliano Enrico
 Maria Eugênia Suconic
 Michelli Provensi
 Becca Pires
 Lucas Maciel
 Mariana Nery
 Olavo Junqueira
 Gui Araújo

MTV Africa

Current VJs
Nenny B
Tshego Wolf Koke (South Africa)
Nomuzi Mabhena (South Africa)

Ehiz (Nigeria)

MTV Germany

Current VJs
Markus Kavka
Joko Winterscheidt
Hadnet Tesfai
Klaas Heufer-Umlauf
Palina Rojinski

Past VJs

 Patrice Bouédibéla
 Sarah Kuttner
 Mirjam Weichselbraun
 Christian Ulmen
 Nora Tschirner
 Anastasia Zampounidis
 Caroline Korneli
 Simone Angel
 Claudia Hiersche
 Johanna Klum
 Nandini Mitra
 Jana Pallaske
 Tom Novy
 Ben Tewaag
 Markus Schultze
 Max von Thun
 Peter Imhof
 Benjamin von Stuckrad-Barre
 Christoph Schlingensief
 Holger Speckhahn
 Sophie Rosentreter
 Simon Krätschmer
 Daniel Budiman

MTV Russia

Current VJs
Irena Ponaroshku

Past VJs
Ivan Urgant
Yana Churikova
Vasily Strelnikov
Aleksandr Anatolievich
Tutta Larsen

MTV Italy

Current VJs 
 Alessandro Cattelan
 Carmen Electra
 Elena Santarelli
 Elisabetta Canalis
 Marco Maccarini
 Victoria Cabello
 Zero Assoluto

Past VJs 
 Daniele Bossari
 Ambra Angiolini
 Fabio Volo
 Gemelli Diversi
 Giorgia Surina
 Giorgio Pasotti
 Mao
 Valeria Bilello

MTV Latin America

Current VJs 
Belén "Belu" Drugueri
Jimmy Sirvant

Past VJs 

Marisabel Bazan
Daisy Fuentes
Ruth Infarinato
Alfredo Lewin
Gonzalo Morales
Lolita Santos
Edith Serrano
Arturo Hernández
Alejandro LaCroix
Leandro O'Brien
Javier Andrade
Carmen Arce
Monica Carranza
Corina González Tejedor
Eduardo "Pocas" Peñafiel
Sebastián "Berta" Muñiz
Ursula Eggers
Eglantina Zingg
Tonka Tomicic
Matilda Svensson
Ilana Sod
Erich Martino a.k.a Koggi
Alexis Yasky
Gabriel "Gabo" Ramos Villalpando
Mikki Lusardi
Cawi Blaksley
Maria Camila Giraldo
Ivana Nadal
Grego Rossello
Lizardo Ponce
Manu Viale
Pamela Voguel
Manuela "Jekill" Botero
Dhasia Wezka

MTV Bangladesh

Current VJs 
Yazdani

MTV Canada

Current VJs 
Daryn Jones
Nicole Holness
Aliya-Jasmine Sovani
Johnny Hockin
Sharlene Chiu
Lenay Dunn

Former VJs 
Gilson Lubin
Jessi Cruickshank
Lauren Toyota
Dan Levy

MTV Ukraine

Current VJs 
Avdey

Former VJs 
Irena Karpa

MTV Estonia

Current VJs 
Piret Järvis

MTV Vietnam

Current VJs 
Đoàn Ngọc Nhi

Former VJs 
Misoa Kim Anh
Nguyễn Đỗ Quỳnh Chi
Nguyễn Tấn Đăng Khoa
Jackie Njine (Tiêu Chấn Huy)
Kaylee Tú Linh
Nina
Dustin Phúc Nguyễn
Nguyễn Sỹ Anh Vũ

References